Devon Wills (born March 28, 1984) is an American women’s lacrosse player. Having played with the Dartmouth Big Green at the collegiate level, she would become the first female player to sign a contract with the New York Lizards of Major League Lacrosse.
From 2007-13, Wills was a member of the United States national team. In 2016, she became the first-ever draft pick of the Long Island Sound, one of four charter franchises in the United Women's Lacrosse League.

Playing career

NCAA
Named the Ivy League Rookie of the Year in 2003, Wills was also named to the All-Ivy League second-team notice. Wills participated in the 2003 and 2004 NCAA quarterfinals in 2003 and 2004. In 2005, Dartmouth qualified for the national semifinals. In her senior season, Wills was named team captain as the team appeared in the 2006 NCAA national championship game.
During her Dartmouth career, Wills also qualified for a spot on the US national development team.

USA Lacrosse
One of Wills’ first experiences with the US national team included a roster spot on the Prague Cup Touring Team in 2008. With the US national team, Wills would capture a pair of gold medals in the FIL World Cup (2009, 2013).
In the aftermath of the 2009 FIL World Cup, Wills logged a 6.69 goals against average and a 46.6 save percentage. Wills was recognized as the Player of the Match in the championship game. She would log eight saves in the 8-7 championship win over Australia. At the 2013 World Cup in Oshawa, Ontario (located east of Toronto), Wills started all seven games. Overall, she would post a goals against average of 5.58. Wills was named to the training squad that shall prepare for the 2017 edition of the FIL World Cup.

UWLX
Selected by the Long Island Sound with their first pick in the 2016 UWLX Draft, Wills would gain the start in the first game in franchise history. In addition, said game was also the first in UWLX history. Opposing the Baltimore Ride, Long Island prevailed by a 13-12 tally. Of note, Wills allowed the first goal in UWLX history to Beth Glaros, while also registering the first win in league history.

Coaching career
Upon graduating from Dartmouth, Wills remained with the program serving as an assistant coach from 2007-08. Serving in the capacities of both defensive coordinator and recruiting coordinator, she also helped to start the Dartmouth Winter Lacrosse Camp.
In 2010, Wills joined the University of Denver as a volunteer assistant in 2010. During the season, the Pioneers enjoyed a 13-5 record, qualifying for the Mountain Pacific Sports Federation finals. In 2011, she would be appointed to a full-time assistant position on the coaching staff. 
Joining the USC Trojans women’s lacrosse program in 2013, Wills would become the associate head coach in 2016. Other roles that she occupied with the program included assistant coach, defensive coordinator, and recruiting coordinator. On August 1, 2018, Wills was announced as the new head coach for Harvard Women's Lacrosse.

Statistics
GP = Games Played
GAA = Goals Against Average
PCT = Percentage
W = Wins
L = Losses
GB = Ground Balls

Statistics source

Awards and honors
2003 Ivy League Rookie of the Year
2003 All-Ivy Second Team
2004-06 All-Ivy First Team
2004-06 IWLCA/US Lacrosse All-America second team
2013 FIL World Cup All-World Team
2006, 2009 Women's Lacrosse Award from Sportswomen of Colorado
2016 UWLX All-Star Selection

References

1984 births
American lacrosse players
Women's lacrosse players
Living people
Sportspeople from Colorado
World Games gold medalists
Competitors at the 2017 World Games
Dartmouth Big Green athletes
New York Lizards players
Dartmouth Big Green coaches
Denver Pioneers coaches
USC Trojans women's lacrosse coaches
Harvard Crimson coaches
Lacrosse goaltenders
American lacrosse coaches